The Cook Islands women's national football team represents the Cook Islands in international women's football. The team is controlled by the Cook Islands Football Association. With a population of around 18,000 people it remains one of the smallest FIFA teams.

Cook Islands has never qualified for a FIFA Women's World Cup, but has entered the OFC Women's Nations Cup five times, in 2003, 2010, 2014, 2018 and 2022.

The contested the OFC Women's Nations Cup in 2022, losing to Fiji in the quarter-final.

Results and fixtures

The following is a list of match results in the last 12 months, as well as any future matches that have been scheduled.

Legend

2022

Players

Current squad
The following players were called up for the 2022 OFC Women's Nations Cup from 13–30 July in Suva, Fiji.

Caps and goals updated as of 12 July 2022, before the game against Tonga.

2019 Squad
The following players were called up for the 2019 Pacific Games from 7–20 July in Apia, Samoa.

Caps and goals updated as of 20 July 2019, after the game against Fiji.

Recent call-ups
The following players have been called up for the team in the last 12 months.

Competitive record

FIFA Women's World Cup

OFC Women's Nations Cup

*Draws include knockout matches decided on penalty kicks.

Pacific Games

See also

Sport in the Cook Islands
Football in the Cook Islands
Women's football in the Cook Islands
Cook Islands national football team
Cook Islands national under-20 football team
Cook Islands national under-17 football team
Cook Islands women's national under-17 football team

References

External links
Official website
FIFA profile

Oceanian women's national association football teams
Football in the Cook Islands
Cook Islands women's national football team